{{DISPLAYTITLE:C5H11Cl}}
The molecular formula C5H11Cl (molar mass: 106.59 g/mol, exact mass: 106.0549 u) may refer to:

 tert-Amyl chloride (2-methyl-2-butyl chloride)
 1-Chloropentane